Nothing to Hide is a 2018 French dramatic comedy film directed by Fred Cavayé, adapted from the 2016 Italian film Perfect Strangers by Paolo Genovese.

Plot
A group of old friends and their partners meet up one evening for a dinner party hosted by Marie and Vincent. A rare lunar eclipse is also expected to occur on the same evening. At the dinner table, after hearing of Ben's questionably humorous story of a woman who found out about her husband's extramarital affairs only upon his death at the hospital after looking through the messages on his unlocked mobile phone, the group then starts discussing their phone lock settings and sharing information on their phones with their partners. To spice up the dinner, Marie then suggests a game where everyone surrenders their phones to the centre of the table and any messages, emails, or calls received on anyone's phone would have to be shared with everyone else. As the game progresses, more secrets begin to unravel, putting doubts on their friendships and marriages.

Cast
 Bérénice Bejo as Marie
 Suzanne Clément as Charlotte
 Stéphane De Groodt as Vincent, Marie's husband
 Vincent Elbaz as Thomas
 Grégory Gadebois as Ben
 Doria Tillier as Léa, Thomas' newly-wedded wife
 Roschdy Zem as Marco, Charlotte's husband
 Fleur Fitoussi as Margot, the daughter of Marie and Vincent

See also
Perfect Strangers (2017), Spanish remake of Perfect Strangers
Intimate Strangers (2018), South Korean remake of Perfect Strangers
Loud Connection (2019), Russian remake of Perfect Strangers
12th Man (2022), loosely based on Nothing to Hide

References

External links
 

2018 comedy-drama films
2018 films
French comedy-drama films
2010s French-language films
French-language Netflix original films
Remakes of Italian films
Films directed by Fred Cavayé
Films set in France
Films shot in France
2010s French films